Saint Louis was a French East Indiaman, launched on 27 July 1752. She served in the Indian Ocean where she participated in three battles and at least one single-ship action.  In 1768, she became a careening hulk in Lorient.

Career
In February 1753, Saint-Louis departed Lorient, bound for the Indian Ocean. She called in at Gorée and Île de France (now Mauritius) before arriving in Pondicherry. She returned via Île de France, Bourbon (now Réunion), and Martinique, returning to Lorient in January 1755.

With the Seven Years' War underway, she was prepared for a new voyage in March 1756, but remained in Lorient harbour, ready to depart, until June. She eventually sailed in December with a 253-man complement and full armament (26 heavy guns out of a total of 54 guns), under Captain Louis de Joannis, to reinforce Aché's Indian Ocean squadron.

At the battle of Negapatam, her first officer, Langery, had his head shot away by a cannonball.

On 29 September 1758, she had an inconclusive engagement with the British East Indiaman Pitt, before returning to France in December 1760.

She cruised again from January 1761 to March 1763. In January 1764 she departed Lorient, armed with 12 guns, bound for Île de France. She returned to Lorient in July 1764.

In September 1766, she departed Lorient with a 211-man complement and 14 guns, sailed to the Indian Ocean, and returned to Lorient in May 1768, but ran aground in the harbour on 31 May. This led to her decommissioning and use as a careening hulk. The French East India Company was dissolved in 1769, and in April 1770 the French Royal Navy purchased Saint Louis.

Fate

Saint Louis was eventually broken up in 1783.

Notes, citations & references

Notes

Citations

References
 
  (1671–1870)

1752 ships
Age of Sail merchant ships
Merchant ships of France